The 2002–03 season of the División de Honor de Futsal is the 14th season of top-tier futsal in Spain.

Regular season

League table

Playoffs

Goalscorers

External links
2002–03 season at lnfs.es

See also
División de Honor de Futsal
Futsal in Spain

2002 03
Spain
futsal